Project Q is the youth program of the Milwaukee LGBT Community Center serving lesbian, gay, bisexual, transgender, questioning, and straight allied young adults ages 24 and under.  Established in 1999, Project Q (PQ) has grown to one of the largest programs at the Milwaukee LGBT Community Center.

PQ has three drop-in days, a day for small groups, and a day for "population specific" groups: ladies lounge, Inside Out, and FOCUS.  Through its programming, activities, groups and events, Project Q provides a space for lesbian, gay, bisexual, transgender and questioning youth and their straight allies.

History

Project Q was founded in 1999 by Kurt Dyer, Justin Lockridge and a group of friends.  It began in the living room of their apartment which was North of the Milwaukee LGBT Community Center's former 315 W. Court St. location. Kurt Dyer served as Project Q's first staff person, leaving as Director of Youth Services in 2007.

Groups

Project Q offers a variety of groups for young adults (24 & under) on health & wellness, identity, discussion, skills building, social outlets, sexual health awareness/education, safety, and life skill development in order to empower young adults to make healthy decisions and to become healthy adults.

Ladies Lounge

Ladies Lounge is a group for female-identified individuals.

FOCUS

Focus is a group for male-identified individuals.

See also

List of LGBT community centers
 List of LGBT-related organizations
 List of youth organizations

References

External links
 Official website

LGBT youth organizations based in the United States
LGBT community centers in the United States
LGBT culture in Wisconsin